(19 October 1906 – 16 January 1975) was one of Japan's most revered kabuki actors from the 1930s until his death. He was officially designated as a "Living National Treasure" by the Japanese government in 1973.

Lineage

Early life
 made his stage debut at the age of 7 in 1913 as  III. He would take the name  VI in 1928, at the  theatre.

Career
 later tried to adapt The Tale of Genji to the stage, but was prohibited from doing so by the authorities.

Four years later, he performed at the opening ceremonies for Tokyo's National Theater.

This was among his final performances, as he died the following month at age 68.

Death
The liver is one of the most toxic parts of the fish, and its sale was prohibited by local ordinances (it was banned nationally in 1984). Claiming that he could survive the fish's poison, he ate the livers and died following eight hours of gradual paralysis and breathing difficulties.

Notes

References

External links
Bandō Mitsugorō VIII at Kabuki21.com

Kabuki actors
1906 births
1975 deaths
Living National Treasures of Japan
Deaths from food poisoning
Male actors from Tokyo
Accidental deaths in Japan
20th-century Japanese male actors